Grebla River may refer to:

 Grebla, a tributary of the Dornișoara in Suceava County
 Grebla, a tributary of the Băiaș in Vâlcea County